Nicolas Benjamin Delapierre (c. 1739 – 24 January 1802) was a well-known and highly regarded French artist during the second half of the 18th century.

Career
Although he began and ended his painting career in France—he was a student of Carle van Loo and Jean-Baptiste-Siméon Chardin—for many intervening years Delapierre painted in Russia.  He was active in Moscow (1767), and later in St. Petersburg (beginning in 1768), where he taught at the Imperial Academy of Arts and painted portraits of family members of Petr Borisovich Sheremetev—one of the wealthiest men in the world at the time.

In 1770 he achieved the title of “agree” at the Academy for a portrait of Catherine II, and also became “royal painter”—executing portraits of the principal members of the imperial family.

By 1786 Delapierre had returned to France and was well established in
Lyon, where he exhibited four of his portraits at the “Salon des Arts”
of Lyon (25 August 1786 – 11 September 1786).  Earlier, he might have
attended the month-long “Salon de 1785” biennial art exposition in
Paris that began on 25 August 1785, because this event was enormously
popular among artists and art enthusiasts and attracted people from
all over Europe.

Mystery
One of his paintings, Portrait of a Seated Gentleman, is the subject of some mystery.  The well-executed portrait, dated 1785, shows an 18th-century gentleman sitting at a desk and beginning to write on a single sheet of paper. On the desk in the foreground is a copy of De la Caisse d'Escompte, a financial pamphlet published on 17 May 1785 by the famous French orator and statesman Mirabeau.

This portrait is particularly intriguing because it was painted several years before Mirabeau achieved prominence, and because the conspicuous financial pamphlet ultimately had important repercussions leading up to the French Revolution. It is believed by some to be the earliest known portrait of Thomas Jefferson.

The ownership of the portrait prior to 1928 is unknown, as is the identity of the sitter. Both are being researched by Omnis, Inc.

Selected paintings
 A Mother Feeding Her Child, 1782
 Portrait of a Seated Gentleman, 1785
 La Fileuse, 1797

References
"L'Exposition du Sallon des Arts de Lyon en 1786." Gazette des Beaux-Arts, Vol. 86, December 1975, pp. 199–206.

BERGER, Benoît. "Sur les traces du peintre Nicolas-Benjamin Delapierre" in Bulletin municipal officiel de la ville de Lyon, 1er octobre 2007, pp. 1–2.

External links
artnet.com

www.mysteryportrait.com

18th-century French painters
French male painters
19th-century French painters
French portrait painters
1802 deaths
Year of birth uncertain
19th-century French male artists
18th-century French male artists